Leibovich is a surname. Notable people with the surname include:
Adam Leibovich (born 1970), American physicist
Avital Leibovich, Director of the American Jewish Committee (AJC) in Israel
Mark Leibovich (born 1965), American journalist and author
Maya Leibovich, the first native-born female rabbi in Israel

See also
Leibovici
Leibowitz